Alelí is a 2019 Uruguayan comedy-drama film directed by Leticia Jorge. It was selected as the Uruguayan entry for the Best International Feature Film at the 93rd Academy Awards, but it was not nominated.

Synopsis
Following the death of their father, siblings begin to argue over the sale of family house.

Cast
 Néstor Guzzini as Ernesto
 Mirella Pascual as Lilián
 Cristina Morán as Alba
 Romina Peluffo as Silvana

See also
 List of submissions to the 93rd Academy Awards for Best International Feature Film
 List of Uruguayan submissions for the Academy Award for Best International Feature Film

References

External links
 

2019 films
2019 comedy-drama films
2010s Spanish-language films
Uruguayan comedy-drama films
Films set in Uruguay